China–Libya relations refers to the bilateral relations between China and Libya. China and Libya established diplomatic relations in August 1978.

Economic relations
In the first 8 months of 2012, Libya was China's 5th largest trading partner in Africa.

Military relations
In 1970, Colonel Muammar Gaddafi and his Prime Minister Abdessalam Jalloud made an unsuccessful attempt to convince China to sell tactical nuclear weapons to Libya. In a bilateral meeting with Chinese Premier Zhou Enlai, Gaddafi unsuccessfully attempted to convince Zhou to sell him a nuclear bomb. Investigators have found that nuclear weapons designs obtained by Libya through a Pakistani smuggling network originated in China.

On 5 September 2012, Libyan NTC spokesman Abdulrahman Busin, said the NTC has hard evidence that Gaddafi bought arms from China. Chinese Foreign Ministry spokeswoman Jiang Yu has confirmed arms sales talks with Gaddafi forces, but no arms were delivered.

Chinese development finance to Libya
From 2000 to 2012, there were 3 Chinese official development finance projects identified in Libya through various media reports. Three batches of humanitarian aid goods were delivered in 2011, an MOU of investment cooperation in the fields of transportation, farming, irrigation, fishing and the textiles, and a US$300 million low-interest loan to the LAP Green Network, a Libyan telecom firm in 2009.

See also
 Sino-African relations
 Sino-Arab relations

References

 
Bilateral relations of Libya
Libya
Libya